Vide cor meum (See my heart) is an aria composed by Irish composer Patrick Cassidy based on Dante Alighieri's Vita Nova, specifically on the sonnet A ciascun'alma presa, third chapter.

Composition
The song was performed by Libera / The Lyndhurst Orchestra, conducted by Gavin Greenaway. The main voices belong to Danielle de Niese and  who sing some fragments taken from Vita Nova, 
Excerpts of the opera can also be heard during King Baldwin’s funeral in the film Kingdom of Heaven. 

Patrick Cassidy's Vide Cor Meum (20th Anniversary Edition)in 2020 - Single by London Symphony Orchestra, London Voices, Ben Parry, Vivica Genaux & Matthew Long by Supertrain Records 

Welsh mezzo-soprano Katherine Jenkins releases a version of Vide Cor Meum on her album Music from the Movies (2012) with the Czech Film Orchestra, David Rowland and Rhys Meirion

British vocal group Blake recorded Vide Cor Meum on their first album Blake (2007) with the London Philharmonic Orchestra 

English soprano Sarah Brightman recorded Vide Cor Meum for her World Tour Limited Edition bonus track her Hymn (album).

Lyrics 
E pensando di lei (Florentin dialect)
Mi sopragiunse un soave sonno
Ego dominus tuus (Latin)
Vide cor tuum
E d'esto cuore ardendo (Florentin dialect)
Cor tuum (Latin)
(Lei paventosa)(Florentin dialect)
Umilmente pascea (Florentin dialect)
Appresso gir lo ne vedea piangendo
La letizia si convertia in amarissimo pianto
Io sono in pace
Cor meum (Latin)
Io sono in pace (Florentin dialect)
Vide cor meum (Latin)
While thinking of her (Beatrice)
A sweet sleep came over me
I am your master
Here is your heart
And on this burning heart
Your heart 
(she fearful)
(she) obediently fed
Then I saw him (Amore) leaving in tears
Joy became bitterest lament
I am in peace
My heart
I am in peace
See my heart

External links
References to Dante in the movie Hannibal, archived from greatdante.net

Film soundtracks
Musical settings of poems by Dante Alighieri
Arias in Italian
Latin-language songs
Works based on La Vita Nuova